Maria Adriana "Ria" Meyburg (born 7 January 1939) is a former artistic gymnast from the Netherlands. She competed at the 1960 Summer Olympics in all artistic gymnastics event with the best achievement of 14th place in the team all-around.

References

1939 births
Living people
Dutch female artistic gymnasts
Gymnasts at the 1960 Summer Olympics
Olympic gymnasts of the Netherlands
Sportspeople from Rotterdam